Joseph Windham-Ashe  (1683–30 July 1746) of Twickenham, Middlesex, was an English merchant and politician who sat in the House of Commons between 1734 and 1746.

Windham-Ashe was born Joseph Windham the son of William Windham of Felbrigg Hall, Norfolk and his wife  Katherine Ashe. He was the brother of William and Ashe. He was related on his father’s side to the Windhams of Norfolk and through his mother and wife to the Ashes of Heytesbury. From about 1718, he was cashier to salt commissioners, holding the post until 1734. He married his cousin  Martha Ashe, the only surviving daughter and heiress of Sir James Ashe, 2nd Baronet, his mother's brother,  in 1715. He assumed the name Ashe by a 1733 Act of Parliament on his wife’s succession to her father’s property at Twickenham Meadows, Cambridge Park, Twickenham and elsewhere in 1733. Windham Ashe enlarged the house (later known as Cambridge House) and built the west front.  

The Ashe inheritance included a lease of the manor of Downton, which held the appointment of the returning officer of Downton. Windham-Ashe was returned unopposed as Member of Parliament for Downton as a government supporter at the 1734 British general election. At the 1741 British general election, he stood down at Downton for John Verney, but was unsuccessful when he stood on the government interest for Bishop's Castle instead. When Verney died, Ashe was returned again for Downton at a by-election on 4 January 1742. Soon afterwards, he transferred the lease of the manor to Anthony Duncombe. Windham-Ashe was put into custody of the serjeant at arms on 18 January  1743 for defaulting on a call of the House. He continued to support the Government.

Windham-Ashe died on 30 July 1746 leaving one daughter Mary, who married John Windham-Bowyer in September 1734. After his death Martha stayed at the house for three years until her death in 1749, when it was bought by  Valens Comyn MP for Hindon.

References

Ashe family*

British MPs 1734–1741
British MPs 1741–1747
1683 births
1746 deaths